Exile in Sarajevo is a 1998 Australian documentary film directed by Tahir Cambis and Alma Sahbaz, in which a Bosnian Australian returns to his homeland to record the impact the siege of Sarajevo on its inhabitants.  It won the  1998 International Emmy for Documentaries.

Awards
 1997 Toronto International Film Festival : Real To Reel
 1998 International Emmy: Documentary

Nominations:
 1999 Logie Awards: Most Outstanding Documentary

External links
 Exile in Sarajevo, SBS
 Exile in Sarajevo, imdb

1998 films
Australian documentary films
Emmy Award-winning programs
1998 documentary films
Documentary films about the Siege of Sarajevo
Bosnian War films